Dortmund Hauptbahnhof is the main railway station in Dortmund, North Rhine-Westphalia, Germany. The station's origins lie in a joint station of the Köln-Mindener Eisenbahn and Bergisch-Märkische Eisenbahn which was built north of the city centre in 1847. That station was replaced by a new station, erected in 1910 at the current site. It featured raised embankments to allow a better flow of traffic.  At the time of its opening, it was one of the largest stations in Germany. It was, however, destroyed in an Allied air raid on 6 October 1944.

The main station hall was rebuilt in the year 1952 in a contemporary style. Its stained glass windows feature then-common professions of Dortmund.

The station has 190,000 passengers passing through each day.

History
The original Dortmund station was built north of the city centre by the Cologne-Minden Railway Company (Cöln-Mindener Eisenbahn-Gesellschaft, CME) as part of its trunk line and opened on 15 May 1847. Two years later the Bergisch-Märkische Railway Company (Bergisch-Märkische Eisenbahn-Gesellschaft, BME) opened its station as a purely terminating station south of the existing station at the end of its main line to Elberfeld (now Wuppertal), its line to Soest (from 1855) and its Ruhr route to Duisburg and Oberhausen (from 1860). The original station building on an island, with access from the castle gate, was replaced in 1910 by a spacious new building at the current location. The tracks were raised to end the obstacle to road traffic through restricted level crossings. This second Dortmund station was inaugurated on 12 December 1910 and was one of the largest in the German Empire when it opened. The station then received the name "Dortmund Hbf" on 1 October 1912. It was destroyed during the Second World War.

The entrance building of Dortmund Hauptbahnhof was replaced in 1952 by a functionalist building. It is regarded as architecturally insignificant, but it has significant stained glass windows on the theme of the former industrial specialisations of Dortmund. Five large stained glass windows document the Dortmund economy. In the middle one the city is shown, flanked to the left and right by a steelworker, a blast furnace worker, a brewer and a bridge builder. During the reconstruction of the station they were removed and the put on exhibition at the Hattingen Henrichshütte (a former steel works, which is partly used as a museum of industry). They were replaced with exact copies.

Reconstruction and rehabilitation 

The reconstruction of the Dortmund Hauptbahnhof has been under discussion since 1997. The original plan for a residential area in the form of an "oversized UFO" (80,000 square metres of usable space) was rejected. On 7 October 1998 a memorandum of understanding had been signed between Deutsche Bahn, the state of North Rhine-Westphalia and Westdeutsche Immobilien Bank. The Deutsche Mark (DM) 850 million project was to be completed by 2002.

After the plans for the so-called "Dortmund UFO" were dropped, a new investor was found in 2001 in the form of the Portuguese investment group Sonae Imobiliaria. The DM 1.2 billion project was to be completed by 2006 and new designs were commissioned from architectural firms in the first quarter of 2001. The new proposed development was called "3do" (3 Dortmund). €75 million of federal and €55 million of state funds were pledged. It was planned to have 36,000 square metres of retail and 26,500 square metres of entertainment space. On 3 February 2006, the Essen branch of the Federal Railway Authority (Eisenbahn-Bundesamt) approved the plans for "3do". On 28 February 2007, Deutsche Bahn announced that the investor was unwilling to commit to the project. 

Through plans for the reconstruction of the station have twice failed, Dortmund Hauptbahnhof suffers significantly from neglect. Only the terminating platforms (tracks 2–5) and the platform of S-Bahn lines S1 and S2 (tracks 6 and 7) have a lift. 

The reconstruction and rehabilitation of the Dortmund Hauptbahnhof began in summer 2009. In a first phase, the station building and related operational areas were gutted. During construction the ticket office and a restaurant of a fast-food chain were placed in containers outside the station. The federal police station and the Bahnhofsmission (a German charity focussed on railway stations)  were also placed in containers on the north side. On 17 June 2011, the first phase was formally completed. Of the total cost of €23 million, the federal government contributed €13.3 million, the state €1.4 million and the Deutsche Bahn €8.3 million.

In a second phase, which is scheduled to be completed until 2024, the station tunnels and the entrances to the platforms will be renewed. Dortmund is one of the few big-city stations in Germany where access to the platforms has not yet made accessible for the disabled. In the course of these alterations the eastern access to the tunnel linking the station's buildings and platforms will also be rebuilt. At the same time it is also intended that there will be improvements to facilitate the introduction of the Rhine-Ruhr Express (a planned upgrade to North Rhine-Westphalia's Regional-Express network).

Services

Long distance
Dortmund Hauptbahnhof is served by Thalys, Flixtrain, Deutsche Bahn Intercity-Express and Intercity services.

Regional services
In local passenger service, Dortmund is served by several regional and S-Bahn lines (as of 2020):

Light rail

The station is served by lines U41, U45, U47 and U49 of the Dortmund Stadtbahn.

∗ U45 becomes at the station Westfalenhallen the line U46 and continues to Brunnenstraße. On match days of the Borussia Dortmund soccer club the line ends instead of the regular terminus Westfalenhallen at the Westfalenstadion station, which is only open on these occasions. In this case it does not continue as U46.

References

!
Rhine-Ruhr S-Bahn stations
S1 (Rhine-Ruhr S-Bahn)
S2 (Rhine-Ruhr S-Bahn)
S5 (Rhine-Ruhr S-Bahn)
!
Railway stations in Germany opened in 1847
1847 establishments in Prussia